Anna Bondár was the reigning champion, but chose not to participate.

Mayar Sherif defeated Kateryna Baindl in the final, 3–6, 7–6(7–3), 7–5.  This was Sherif's fourth WTA Challenger singles title.

Seeds

Draw

Finals

Top half

Bottom half

Qualifying

Seeds

Qualifiers

Qualifying draw

First qualifier

Second qualifier

Third qualifier

Fourth qualifier

References

External Links
Main Draw
Qualifying Draw

2022 WTA 125 tournaments